Serhiy Andriyovych Bilous (born 18 June 1999) is a Ukrainian professional footballer who plays as a right winger.

References

External links
 
 
 

1999 births
Living people
People from Kirovohrad Oblast
Piddubny Olympic College alumni
Ukrainian footballers
Association football forwards
FC Zirka Kropyvnytskyi players
FC Hirnyk-Sport Horishni Plavni players
FC Kremin Kremenchuk players
Ukrainian First League players
Sportspeople from Kirovohrad Oblast